2020 Vision or Vision 2020 may refer to:

 20/20 vision, the measure of visual acuity for normal vision

Music
 20/20 Vision (Anti-Flag album), 2020
 20/20 Vision (Ronnie Milsap album), 1976
 20:20 Vision (album), by ApologetiX, 2012
 2020 Visions (album), by Stephen Dale Petit, 2020

Strategic plans
Croydon Vision 2020, for the London Borough of Croydon, England
Wawasan 2020, for Malaysia
India Vision 2020
Joint Vision 2020, a U.S. defense doctrine
Vision 2020 (Rwanda)
Vision 2020 for Science, for Roper Mountain Science Center in South Carolina, U.S.
Vision 2020: New York City Comprehensive Waterfront Plan, U.S.

Other uses
 "20/20 Vision" (The Twilight Zone), an episode of the TV series
 2020 Vision Campaign, a former campaign for a nuclear-weapon-free world
 2020 Visions, a science fiction comic book and limited series by Jamie Delano

See also
 "Kanye 2020 Vision", a slogan used in the Kanye West 2020 presidential campaign